Hyundai Mobis (short for Mobile and System) is a public South Korean car parts company. Founded as Hyundai Precision & Industries Corporation in 1977, the company forms the "parts and service" arm for the South Korean automakers Hyundai Motor Company, Genesis Motors and Kia Motors. As of 2014, it was the "world's No. 6 automotive supplier."

History
Headquartered in Seoul, South Korea, it was founded on June 25, 1977 as Hyundai Precision & Industries Corporation. In 2000, the company changed its name to Hyundai Mobis. The company forms the "parts and service" arm for the South Korean automakers Hyundai Motor Company, Genesis Motors and Kia Motors. In 2013, the company had revenue of US$ 33 billion. As of 2014, it was "the world's No. 6 automotive supplier" in Bloomberg.

In May 2016, the company ranked #297 on the Forbes Global 2000, with a market cap of US $21.3 billion.
 In 2015, it had revenues of $32.11 billion.

Products
The company offers chassis, cockpit, and front-end modules; safety products, including airbags; headlights; anti-lock brake system and electronic stability control products; steering parts; multimedia systems; Kia Connect systems; injection-molded plastic parts, such as instrument panels, carriers, and bumpers; and steel wheel rims and decks. It also supplies after-sales service parts for vehicles. Concentrating its resources on A/S parts sales, module parts manufacture and parts export, Hyundai MOBIS has firmly established its position as the leading auto parts specialist company.

Car production 
In the 1990s, Hyundai Precision produced the Hyundai Galloper and Santamo cars at the Ulsan plant next to Giant Hyundai motor complex. Hyundai motor Ulsan complex was at that time the world's single largest motor plant of 1.5 million units production capacity.

I.E 5 assembly plant of 30,000 car production annual capacity since 2000s, but production shifted to the Hyundai Motor Company in 1999.

See also 
 Ulsan Mobis Phoebus

References

External links 
 
 Mobis Japan Homepage
 Mobis Alabama Homepage
 Mobis India Homepage

Mobis
Auto parts suppliers of South Korea
Automotive companies established in 1977
Companies listed on the Korea Exchange
Defence companies of South Korea
South Korean companies established in 1977